Now Singing In 12 Great Movies is a 1963 studio album by the American singer Billy Eckstine. It was arranged by Billy Byers, conducted by Bobby Tucker, and produced by Quincy Jones.

Reception

The 2002 reissue of the album was reviewed by Ken Dryden at Allmusic who critiqued the marketing of the album as a jazz album. Dryden described the music as "very listenable, with a solid performance throughout by Eckstine" though the arrangements he felt were "very predictable, lacking any significant improvising or solos, awash in strings with a rhythm section that seems on autopilot....Billy Eckstine's vocal abilities are never in question, but jazz fans need to know what to expect prior to purchasing this reissue." Now Singing In 12 Great Movies was chosen as a "Four Star Album" at the time of its release from Billboard magazine in February 1964.

Track listing 
 "More (Theme from Mondo Cane)" (Norman Newell, Nino Oliviero, Riz Ortolani) - 2:40
 "The High and the Mighty" (Dimitri Tiomkin, Ned Washington) - 4:00
 "Moon River" (Henry Mancini, Johnny Mercer) - 2:38
 "Never on Sunday" (Manos Hatzidakis, Billy Towne) - 2:47
 "Tender Is the Night" (Sammy Fain, Paul Francis Webster) - 3:18
 "Manhã de Carnival (Morning of the Carnival)" (Luiz Bonfá, Antônio Maria) - 2:51	
 "A Felicidade (Adieu Tristesse)" (Antonio Carlos Jobim, Vinícius de Moraes, Andre Michel Salvet) - 2:47
 "Three Coins in the Fountain" (Sammy Cahn, Jule Styne) - 3:47
 "Days of Wine and Roses" (Mancini, Mercer) - 2:50
 "On Green Dolphin Street" (Bronisław Kaper, Ned Washington) - 2:35
 "My Own True Love" (Mack David, Max Steiner) - 3:29
 "The Good Life" (Sacha Distel, Jack Reardon) - 3:36
 "Tonight" (Leonard Bernstein, Stephen Sondheim) - 2:43

Personnel 
 Billy Eckstine - vocals
 Billy Byers - arranger
 Bobby Tucker - conductor, piano
 Hal Mooney Orchestra
 Quincy Jones - producer
 Ralph J. Gleason - liner notes

Reissue personnel
 Hollis King - art direction
 Sherniece Smith - art producer
 JoDee Stringham - design
 Ken Drunker - executive producer
 David Garland - reissue liner notes
 Peter Keepnews - liner notes
 Cynthia Sesso - photo research
 Mark Smith - production assistant
 Kevin Reeves - reissue mastering
 Bryan Koniarz - reissue producer

References

1963 albums
Albums arranged by Billy Byers
Albums produced by Quincy Jones
Billy Eckstine albums
Mercury Records albums